Castagno may refer to:

 Andrea del Castagno, an Italian painter from Florence
 Dino Castagno, an Argentine professional footballer
 Castagno d'Andrea, a frazione of the comune of San Godenzo, in the Metropolitan City of Florence, Tuscany, Italy

See also 

 Castano (disambiguation)
 Castaño (disambiguation)
 Castagna (disambiguation)